The Gallipoli Art Prize is an Australian acquisitive art prize that celebrates the Gallipoli campaign of the First World War, awarded annually by the Gallipoli Memorial Club and worth .

The prize's organisers began work in 2004. The Anzac Centenary Art Prize project was announced on 15 April 2005 by Australian prime minister John Howard. The inaugural prize was awarded in 2006, when it was won by Margaret Hadfield.
Entries do not need to reference the Gallipoli campaign or portray war: entrants are instead encouraged to "respond imaginatively to the Gallipoli Memorial Club's creed":

The award is run by the Gallipoli Memorial Club. It is open to artists born in Australia, New Zealand or Turkey or holding citizenship of those countries. A connected prize in Turkey, the Canakkale Art Prize, is also run annually and sponsored by the club.

The 2022 Gallipoli Art Prize was won by a painting entitled Along the ride to Damascus, by Deirdre Bean.

References

External links

Awards established in 2006
2006 establishments in Australia